Daniel Book (born July 20, 1983) is a platinum-selling, BMI Award-winning producer and songwriter, originally from Baltimore, Maryland. After moving to Los Angeles, he has racked up a discography with notable label artists as well as composing and producing songs for Disney Television and Films. He is currently published by and writing music for Sony/ATV Music Publishing. He is also the former lead singer of the band VooDoo Blue.

Select Discography

References

1983 births
Record producers from Maryland
Songwriters from Maryland
American male songwriters
Living people